The Bookseller Gave Up Bathing is a 1969 Swedish drama film directed by Jarl Kulle.

Cast
 Allan Edwall as Jacob
 Margaretha Krook as Amelie Arbel
 Jarl Kulle as Krakow
 Ingvar Kjellson as Elim Svensson
 Nils Eklund as Stickselius
 Olof Bergström as Trolle
 Ulla Sjöblom as Mrs. Borodin
 Göran Stangertz as Rikard
 Chris Wahlström as Sabina
 Georg Skarstedt as Undertaker
 Göthe Grefbo as Priest
 Hans Strååt as Vicar

References

External links
 

1969 films
1969 drama films
Swedish drama films
1960s Swedish-language films
1960s Swedish films